Freshwater eel poaching and smuggling have emerged in recent years as a direct response to the sustained popularity of eels as food combined with the eels' low population, endangered status, and subsequent protections. Freshwater eel are elongated fish in the Anguillidae family of ray-finned fish. The three most commonly consumed  eel species are the Japanese eel (A. japonica), European eel (A. anguilla), and American eel ( A. rostrata).

The life cycle for eels has not been closed in captivity on a sustainable level, and any eel farms rely entirely on wild-caught elvers (juvenile eels). These elvers are caught from their native ranges in North America and Europe and are smuggled into East Asian eel farms, where they are often relabeled as the native Japanese eel to subvert legislation. The eels are smuggled disguised as other cargo, such as luggage or other meat products.

Legislation 
The EU placed a ban on import and export of European eels in 2010.

In the US, the only states that are allowed to harvest glass eels are Maine and South Carolina, though Maine is the only one reporting a significant harvest. Market price for glass eels "has risen to more than $2,000 per pound, although in 2014 prices were recorded between $400 and $650 per pound."

In Japan, the Japanese eel is protected under CITES and harvest is illegal. On 4 December 2020, Japan's The National Diet placed a "ban [on] the importation of illegal, unreported, and unregulated (IUU) seafood." Japan's Fisheries Agency is planning on raising the fine for smuggling of glass eels "from ¥100,000 to ¥30 million starting in 2023, in a bid to stem a source of funding of organized crime syndicates" and increasing the "maximum period of imprisonment for glass eel poaching...[from] six months to three years."

Smuggling and arrests 
In order to continue to feed the demand for freshwater eel, poachers began smuggling eels from North American and Europe to stock eel farms in East Asia.

In the 2018-19 fishing season, EUROPOL seized "5 789 kg of smuggled glass eels with an estimated value of € 2 000 per kilo" under the European Union Action Plan against wildlife trafficking.

2019's Operation Fame resulted in 43 arrests and the seizure of 737 kg of glass eels. The fish were in route to Asia and were camouflaged among other cargo, often other meat.

2019's Operation Broken Glass, led by the U.S. Fish and Wildlife Service, led to the arrests of 19 smugglers. All of the smugglers were charged with violations of the Lacey Act, and were believed to be responsible for over $7 million in illegal elver sales.

In 2018, Canadian authorities intercepted 18 tons of eel meat arriving from Asian eel farms, all of which were suspected to be poached from Europe originally, raised in Asian eel farms, and destined to be sold on the North American market.

EUROPOL's Operation Lake ran from October 2018 to April 2020 and resulted in the arrest of 108 elver smugglers and the seizure of 6.2 million euros worth of elvers.

References 

Eels
Poaching
Wildlife smuggling